Pyrrhulina elongata is a species of fish in the Pyrrhulina genus found in the Amazon basin, specifically within the Tapajós basin, in creeks and in small ponds. They grow no more than a few centimeters.

References

External links
 

Fish described in 2001
Taxa named by Axel Zarske
Taxa named by Jacques Géry
Fish of Brazil
Lebiasinidae